Solanum agnewiorum is a species of Solanum. The species is andromonoecious. It is native to Kenya and occurs in 4 locations.

Solanum agnewiorum is currently listed as endangered by the IUCN.

References 

agnewiorum
Flora of Kenya